Sinometrius is a genus of beetles in the family Carabidae.

References

Paussinae